Monica Knudsen (born 25 March 1975) is a Norwegian football coach and former player who managed Toppserien club LSK Kvinner. As a player, Knudsen was a midfielder who won 87 caps for the Norway women's national football team between 1996 and 2003.

Career
Knudsen was on the Norwegian teams that hosted UEFA Women's Euro 1997 and then finished fourth at the 1999 FIFA Women's World Cup in the United States. Knudsen won the Toppserien league with her club Asker in 1998 and 1999.

Knudsen was with the Norway team that won gold at the 2000 Summer Olympics in Sydney. She played as a substitute in the semifinal and was one of the starting eleven in Norway's 3–2 final win over the United States, being substituted after 90 minutes, before the start of extra time.

At the end of 2009 Knudsen was appointed chief trainer for LSK Kvinner FK football club.

Personal life
Knudsen was born in Arendal on 25 March 1975.

References

External links
 
 
  
 
 
 

1975 births
Living people
Norwegian women's footballers
Footballers at the 2000 Summer Olympics
Olympic footballers of Norway
Olympic gold medalists for Norway
Olympic medalists in football
1999 FIFA Women's World Cup players
2003 FIFA Women's World Cup players
Fortuna Hjørring players
Norwegian expatriate sportspeople in Denmark
Toppserien players
FK Donn players
Asker Fotball (women) players
LSK Kvinner FK players
Norwegian expatriate women's footballers
Expatriate men's footballers in Denmark
Norwegian women's football managers
LSK Kvinner FK managers
Medalists at the 2000 Summer Olympics
Norway women's international footballers
Women's association football midfielders
People from Arendal
Sportspeople from Agder